The Abbot of Gloucester was the title of the head of Gloucester Abbey in Gloucester, England.

The Benedictine abbey was founded about 1022 and was dedicated to Saint Peter. It is recorded that the abbey lost about a quarter of its complement of monks in 1377 due to the Black Death.

In 1540, the abbey was dissolved by King Henry VIII, and it became Gloucester Cathedral the following year.

Notes

References

 

 
 

Abbots of Gloucester
Benedictine abbots by monastery
Abbots of Gloucester
Gloucestershire-related lists